Grundman is a surname. Notable people with the surname include:

Bernie Grundman, American audio engineer
Clare Grundman (1913–1996), American band composer and arranger
Helen G. Grundman, professor of mathematics at Bryn Mawr College
Irving Grundman (1928–2021), former general manager of the Montreal Canadiens
Ya'akov Grundman (1939–2004), Israeli footballer and manager

See also
Grundmann
Grundig (surname)

Jewish surnames
Germanic-language surnames